Sir Robert John Miles, styled Mr Justice Miles, is a British High Court Judge.

Personal life and Education
Miles was born on the 29th of November 1962, later studying philosophy, politics and economics at Oxford University before obtaining a Diploma in Law at City University and returning to Oxford University to take the Bachelor of Civil Law.

In 1999, Miles married Lisabel Mary Macdonald.

Career
Called to the Bar in 1987, Miles practised from Chambers at 4 Stone Buildings, in Lincoln's Inn, specialising in commercial and financial law and civil fraud, often with a foreign element. He was appointed as King's Counsel in 2002 and as a Deputy High Court Judge in 2006. From June 2012 he served as Attorney-General of the Duchy of Lancaster.

On 21 April 2020 he was appointed as a Justice of the High Court and on 16 March 2022 he received the customary knighthood. Miles has also co-edited Oxford University Press’s Annotated Companies Legislation.

References

Chancery Division judges
British King's Counsel
Knights Bachelor
Alumni of City, University of London
Living people
Members of Lincoln's Inn
21st-century King's Counsel
Attorneys-General of the Duchy of Lancaster
1962 births